Ukraine in Flames (translit. Bitva za nashu Sovetskuyu Ukrainu, lit. "Battle for our Soviet Ukraine") is a 1943 Soviet documentary war film by Ukrainian director Oleksandr Dovzhenko and Yuliya Solntseva. It is Dovzhenko's second World War II documentary, and dealt with the Battle of Kharkov. The film incorporates German footage of the invasion of Ukraine, which was later captured by the Soviets.

Plot 
The plot tells of the events of autumn 1943 on the southern fronts of the German-Soviet war. The film differs from its peers in that for the first time viewers of the military chronicle heard the "living voices" of soldiers, a huge number of philosophical generalizations written by O. Dovzhenko in the form of lyrical reflections and voiced by Leonid Khmara.

The film includes footage of the trophy German newsreel.

External links 

 with Italian subtitles
New York Times review published on April 3, 1944

1943 films
Films directed by Alexander Dovzhenko
Films directed by Yuliya Solntseva
Films set in Ukraine
Soviet documentary films
Soviet-era Ukrainian films
Soviet World War II propaganda films
Soviet black-and-white films
Ukrainian black-and-white films
Documentary films about Ukraine
Russian-language Ukrainian films
1943 documentary films
Ukrainian documentary films